The Bayas Islets are a group of four islands in the Visayan Sea, east of Estancia, Iloilo, Philippines. The Islets include:

 Bayas Island
 Manipulon Islet
 Magosipal Islet
 Pangalan Islet

References

Islands of Iloilo